is a Prefectural Natural Park in central Tokushima Prefecture, Japan. Established in 2006, the park spans the borders of the municipalities of Kaiyō, Kamikatsu, Kamiyama, and Naka.

See also
 National Parks of Japan

References

Parks and gardens in Tokushima Prefecture
Protected areas established in 2006
2006 establishments in Japan
Kaiyō, Tokushima
Naka, Tokushima
Kamiyama, Tokushima
Kamikatsu, Tokushima